George Washington "Doc" Penton (September 6, 1882 – July 11, 1969) was an American football player and coach. He served as the head football coach at Jacksonville State Normal School (now Jacksonville State University) in 1910 and at Troy State Normal School (now Troy University) from 1911 to 1912, compiling a career college football coaching record of 8–4–3.  Penton played college football at Auburn University as a guard and fullback from 1907 to 1909. He was the brother of fellow football player and coach, John Penton.

Playing career
Penton played football, baseball, basketball, and track at Auburn University. He was a guard and fullback for Mike Donahue's Auburn Tigers football team from 1907 to 1909.

1909
Dick Jemison selected him second-team All-Southern at fullback.

Coaching career

1912
Penton was athletic director at Troy University and led the Troy Trojans to its only perfect season in 1912, a 3–0 record.

1913
Penton was then an assistant under Donahue in 1913. His first year there the team won the Southern Intercollegiate Athletic Association championship.

1919–1921
Penton coached the Sidney Lanier High School Poets from 1919 to 1921.

Head coaching record

College

References

External links
 

1882 births
1969 deaths
American football fullbacks
American football guards
Auburn Tigers football coaches
Auburn Tigers football players
Jacksonville State Gamecocks football coaches
Troy Trojans athletic directors
Troy Trojans football coaches
High school football coaches in Alabama
People from Coosa County, Alabama
Sportspeople from Montgomery, Alabama
Coaches of American football from Alabama
Players of American football from Montgomery, Alabama